David Caplovitz (died October 1, 1992) was a United States-based sociologist. He is known as the author of The Poor Pay More and for advancing consumer protection.

Recognition
Caplovitz won a Guggenheim Fellowship in 1977.

References

American sociologists
Year of birth missing
Graduate Center, CUNY faculty
1992 deaths